Cal Anderson Park is a public park on Seattle, Washington's Capitol Hill that includes Lincoln Reservoir and Bobby Morris Playfield.

Features
The north end of the open park features Waterworks, a large mountain-shaped water fountain feeding a shallow texture pool, a reflecting pool, and a wading pool.  The south end features the lighted Bobby Morris Playfield. The wading pool operates in the summer months from 12 noon to 7 p.m.

Other features:
 Shelterhouse
 Plaza
 Children's play area
 Caged tennis courts with outdoor lights
 Basketball courts
 Dodgeball court

History

Lincoln Reservoir was begun in 1889, in response to the Great Seattle Fire of the same year, and was completed in 1901. A parcel just south of it was named Lincoln Park the same year.  The famed Olmsted Brothers designed the park, as part of their many works in the Seattle area. In 1908 it was developed as a playfield, and in 1922 its name was changed to Broadway Playfield so as not to duplicate the name of the new Lincoln Park in West Seattle. The playfield was named after Bobby Morris, former King County, Washington auditor, in 1980. Meanwhile, the area around the reservoir had come to be known as Lincoln Reservoir Park.
On April 10, 2003, the entire area was designated Cal Anderson Park, after Washington's first openly gay state legislator. Anderson had died in 1995 of AIDS.

From 2003–2005, the reservoir was rebuilt as a covered basin.

Three security cameras were installed in the park in April 2008 in an effort to combat certain types of criminal activity, namely vandalism, drug dealing, and public sex.

In 2004, World Naked Bike Ride Seattle established a tradition of stopping briefly in the park, usually in the midsection near the shelter house and water feature. Body Pride ride also began making stops in 2005.

In 2009, Forbes magazine recognized Cal Anderson Park as one of the 12 Best City Parks in the U.S.

The Seattle March for Science took place at the park on April 22, 2017.

On June 8, 2020, protesters occupied the park and declared it part of the Capitol Hill Autonomous Zone (CHAZ). The area was renamed the Capitol Hill Occupied Protest (CHOP) several days later. 

On June 20, 2020, a shooting took place in the park, which served as a gathering area in the CHOP at the time. A 19-year-old man was fatally shot, and a 33-year-old man was critically injured. The incident was cited by opponents of the zone as a justification to disband it, using either the National Guard or the Seattle Police Department.

Light rail station
The northwest corner of Cal Anderson Park (at the corner of East Denny Way and Nagle Place) contains an entrance to the underground Capitol Hill Station of Sound Transit's Link light rail.

References

External links

Cal Anderson Park
Cal Anderson Park Improvements
Video History of Cal Anderson Park

Parks in Seattle
Capitol Hill, Seattle